Ringo Starr (b. 1940) is an English drummer, singer, actor, and former member of The Beatles. 

Ringo may also refer to:

Places
Ringō, Nan'yō, a town in Yamagata Prefecture, Japan
Ringō Station
Ringo, Kansas, a community in the United States

People

Nickname, stagename, pseudonym
Ringo (singer) (born 1947), French singer of the 1970s and 1980s
František Ringo Čech (born 1943), Czech musician
Rashad "Ringo" Smith (born 1972), American record producer
Oscar Bonavena (1942–1976), Argentine boxer
Mike Wieringo (1963–2007), American comic book artist, sometimes signed 'Ringo'
Ringo Garza (born 1981), American drummer from Los Lonely Boys
Ringo Madlingozi (born 1964), South African jazz musician and member of parliament
Mahmood Abdulrahman (born 1984), Bahraini footballer
Ringo Sheena (born 1978), Japanese singer, guitarist and pianist
Alexanda Kotey (born 1983), a member of "the Beatles" terrorist cell
Derick Adamson (born 1958), Jamaican marathon runner

Surname
Daniel Ringo (1803–1873), United States federal judge
Diana Ringo (born 1992), Finnish film director and composer
Frank Ringo (1860–1889), American baseball catcher
Jim Ringo (1931–2007), American football player
John Ringo (born 1963), American author
Johnny Ringo (1850–1882), American Old West outlaw who was murdered
Johnny Ringo (musician) (born 1961), Jamaican reggae deejay
Josef Ringo (1883–1946), Russian scientist, inventor, writer
Kelee Ringo (born June 27, 2002), American football player
Shirley Ringo (born 1940), American politician

Given name
 Ringo Aoba, Japanese voice actress
 Ringo Cantillo (born 1956), American soccer player
 Ringo Lam (1955–2018), Hong Kong film director, producer and scriptwriter
 Ringo Le, American filmmaker
 Ringo Lee Chiew Chwee, convicted murderer from Singapore
 Ringo Mendoza (born 1949), Mexican wrestler

Fictional characters
Ringo Oginome, from the manga and anime series Mawaru Penguindrum
Ringo Akai, from the manga and anime series Tokyo Mew Mew
Ringo Andou, from the Puyo Puyo video game series
Ringo Brown, from the Australian soap opera Neighbours
Ringo Noyamano, from the manga and anime series Air Gear
Ringo Seto, a character in Angelic Layer
Jimmy Ringo, from the 1950 film The Gunfighter
The Ringo Kid, from the film Stagecoach and its remakes
Ringo Roadagain, a character from Steel Ball Run
Ringo, in A Pistol for Ringo and The Return of Ringo
Ringo, in Ringo the Lone Rider
Ringo, played by Kirk Morris in Rita of the West
Ringo, in Never the Twain
Ringo, in Legacy of Lunatic Kingdom
Ringo, in Fallout: New Vegas

Entertainment
Ringo (game), a German board game
Ringo, a comic by William Vance
Ringo, a British alternative rock band (1992–1994) fronted by Tim Keegan
Ringo (album), a 1973 album by Ringo Starr
"Ringo" (song), a 1964 single by Lorne Greene
Ringo (1978 film), a TV movie starring Ringo Starr
Ringo (2005 film), a short film by Alf Seccombe and Conall Jones
Ringo (TV series), a 2019 Mexican telenovela

Spaghetti Western Films
A Pistol for Ringo, Italian: Una pistola per Ringo (1965)
The Return of Ringo, Italian: Il ritorno di Ringo (1965)
100.000 dollari per Ringo (1965) 
Ringo and Gringo Against All (1966)
Ringo and His Golden Pistol, Italian: Johnny Oro (1966)
Ringo of Nebraska (1966)
The Texican, Italian: Ringo il Texano (1966)
Two R-R-Ringos from Texas (1967)
Ringo the Face of Revenge (1967)

Other uses
Nokia rinGo, a 1990s mobile phone
Ringo R470, a computer similar to the Sinclair ZX81
Ringo (software), defunct international calling app
Ringo (sport), a Polish net sport
 Ringos, a brand name of a type of crisp manufactured by Golden Wonder

See also
Rango (disambiguation)
Ring (disambiguation)
Rongo